Amnirana galamensis is a species of frog in the family Ranidae. It is found in western, central, and eastern Africa. Its natural habitats are dry savanna, moist savanna, subtropical or tropical moist shrubland, rivers, shrub-dominated wetlands, swamps, freshwater lakes, intermittent freshwater lakes, freshwater marshes, intermittent freshwater marshes, rural gardens, urban areas, water storage areas, ponds, canals and ditches.

References
 Rödel, M.-O., Poynton, J.C., Largen, M., Howell, K. & Lötters, S. 2004.  Amnirana galamensis.   2006 IUCN Red List of Threatened Species.   Downloaded on 23 July 2007.

galamensis
Amphibians described in 1841
Taxonomy articles created by Polbot